Leszek Hallmann was a Polish Paralympic powerlifter. He won the silver medal in the men's +100 kg event at the 1996 Summer Paralympics held in Atlanta, Georgia, United States.

He also competed at the 2000 Summer Paralympics in Sydney, Australia and the 2004 Summer Paralympics in Athens, Greece.

He died in January 2019.

References

External links 
 

20th-century births
2019 deaths
Powerlifters at the 1996 Summer Paralympics
Powerlifters at the 2000 Summer Paralympics
Powerlifters at the 2004 Summer Paralympics
Medalists at the 1996 Summer Paralympics
Paralympic medalists in powerlifting
Paralympic silver medalists for Poland
Paralympic powerlifters of Poland
20th-century Polish people
21st-century Polish people